Words and Pictures is a British children's literacy television programme which aired as part of BBC Schools, starting in 1970.

1970s
The series began in March 1970 as a spin-off from the BBC schools programme, Look and Read, which was already providing the same type of practice and encouragement for older children. The first series was presented by Gabriel Woolf and set in an attic full of toys, who have adventures related to phonics. Two episodes aired each week, one ("Programme A") at the start and the other ("Programme B") at the end. This was meant to cater for younger children and allowed teachers to do some follow-up work in the classroom in between. A total of 16 episodes aired.

The second series started airing weekly in 1972, for 20 episodes. The format and presenter changed, the second series being about a young man called Sam Samson (played by Tony Robinson) who daydreams about an island inhabited by "Boffs". The series was later repeated as Sam on Boffs' Island.

In 1975 Henry Woolf took over as presenter, with the setting changing to a bookshop. He was assisted by an Aniform puppet character named Charlie and a "magic pencil", who would describe and show how to form the letter using a rhyme with each letter. This series contained a story in each episode along with songs and rhymes.

1980s
A fourth series began airing in 1982, this time presented by Vicky Ireland. The format was unchanged, and the setting changed to a library. Ireland presented the show until 1989, and presented 84 episodes. She was the series' longest-serving presenter.

An episode of this series is shown in a scene of the post-apocalyptic drama Threads; ten years after a nuclear war, characters are watching the programme (via a still-functioning VCR) in a makeshift school.

1990s onwards
In 1990 the programme was presented by Stuart Bradley and a cat puppet called Nutmeg, who could operate a word processor. This series also contained footage from the outside world.

In 1992 the presenter was Sophie Aldred, known in children's TV as "Sophie Socket". She continued to present studio-based programmes. The BBC also produced two VHS tapes, again presented by Sophie. Time For A Story featured some of the stories from the 1992/93 series and Alphabet Fun Time featured the phonic animations animated by Alan Rogers and Peter Lang with Magic Pencil.

For the following series in 1993, Michael Hobbs presented the show, again based in the studio and coloured letters were written by the Magic Pencil for the first time to join the white ones. Aldred was brought back for the next series due to her popularity. Aldred continued to present the show until its run in 2001, and also presented two specials, Phonics Special and Phonics Year 2, in 1999 and 2001. The last series was set in a lighthouse, and Aldred is visited by Sid the Seagull, Salty Sam the Sailor and Colin the Clam as well as actors who read out story books.

A spin-off series, aimed at younger children started airing in 1999, titled Words and Pictures Plus. This series was presented by Paul Ewing. The programmes proceeded at a slower pace, of one phonic per episode. This series was also produced on both VHS and DVD on the BBC Schools website. In 2001, a new collection of four Magic Pencil programmes began airing, which were edited from the Alphabet Fun Time VHS tape released in 1994, again presented by Sophie Aldred.

A remake series of Words and Pictures with the subtitle "Fun with Phonics" was launched on CBeebies in 2006. This series was made up of short, four minute episodes, each concentrating on one particular letter sound. There were two presenters, Pui Fan Lee and William Vanderpuye, each presenting 22 of the 44 episodes in the series. Re-edited versions of the episodes, with some extra material, are available to buy on DVD in shops. These episodes were re-edited for school use, combining two episodes together.

Airing
Gabriel Woolf (16 episodes, 1970)
Tony Robinson (20 episodes, 1972–73)
Henry Woolf (56 episodes, 1975–78)
Vicky Ireland (84 episodes, 1982–89)
Stuart Bradley (28 episodes, 1990)
Sophie Aldred (80 episodes, 1992–1993; 1996–2001)
Michael Hobbs (28 episodes, 1993–94)
Paul Ewing (28 episodes, 1999–2001)
Pui Fan Lee (22 episodes, 2006–07)
William Vanderpuye (22 episodes, 2006–07)

References

Alster, Laurence (1997) 'Auntie's long lesson' in Times Educational Supplement 19 September 1997, TES2 p. 26 (available online)
BBC (1975) Words and Pictures Teacher's Notes Autumn 1975. London: BBC
BBC (1978) Words and Pictures Teacher's Notes Spring 1978. London: BBC
BBC (1982) Words and Pictures Teacher's Notes Autumn 1982. London: BBC
BBC (1987/I) Words and Pictures Teacher's Notes Autumn 1987. London: BBC
BBC (1987/II) BBC Radio and Television for Primary and Middle Schools 1987–8. London: BBC Books
BBC (1998) Words and Pictures Teacher's Notes Autumn 1998. London: BBC
BBC (2001) BBC Primary Catalogue 2001–2002. Wetherby: BBC Educational Publishing
Brace, Alison (2000) "Will Auntie's lessons survive the e-volution?" in Times Educational Supplement 14 July 2000 p. 21
Hayter, C.G. (1974) Using Broadcasts in Schools: A Study and Evaluation. London: BBC Publications ("a joint BBC/ITV publication")
Moses, Diana & Croll, Paul (1991) School Television in Use. London: Libbey
Porter, Pam (1978) Television with Slow Learning Children: attention to educational television programmes. London: IBA

External links
 
 Words and Pictures: Fun with Phonics
 
 Words and Pictures at Broadcast for Schools

1970 British television series debuts
2006 British television series endings
1970s British children's television series
1980s British children's television series
1990s British children's television series
2000s British children's television series
British children's education television series
British television shows featuring puppetry
British television shows for schools
British television series with live action and animation
Reading and literacy television series
BBC children's television shows
Television series by BBC Studios
British television series revived after cancellation